

Astronomy
 Publication of Erasmus Reinhold's ephemeris, the Tabulae prutenicae, helping to disseminate Copernican methods of astronomical calculation.

Botany
 Bolognese naturalist Ulisse Aldrovandi begins to collect plants for a herbarium.

Mathematics
 Georg Joachim Rheticus publishes Canon of the Science of Triangles.

Medicine
 By July – Fifth and last outbreak of sweating sickness in England. Dr. John Caius writes the first full contemporary account of the symptoms of the disease.
 Conrad Gessner is the first to describe adipose tissue.

Zoology
 Pierre Belon publishes Histoire naturelle des estranges poissons.
 Conrad Gessner begins publication of his encyclopedic illustrated Historiae animalium in Zurich.

Publications
 Martín Cortés de Albacar publishes Breve compendio de la esfera y del arte de navegar in Spain, an influential work in cosmography, proposing spherical charts and mentioning magnetic deviation and the existence of magnetic poles.

Births
 approx. date'' – Timothy Bright, English physician (died 1615)

Deaths
 April 6 – Joachim Vadian, Swiss physician and polymath (born 1484)
 May 6 − Johannes Baptista Montanus Italian physician and humanist (born 1498)
 August 8 – Fray Tomás de Berlanga, Spanish Bishop of Panama and discoverer of the Galápagos Islands (born 1487)

References

 
16th century in science
1550s in science